Omorgus monachus is a beetle of the family Trogidae. It is found in the United States from the Great Lakes region to Florida and west to Nebraska, Kansas, Oklahoma and eastern Texas.

References

monachus
Beetles of the United States
Endemic fauna of the United States
Beetles described in 1790
Taxa named by Johann Friedrich Wilhelm Herbst